Venusia eucosma is a moth in the family Geometridae first described by Louis Beethoven Prout in 1914. It is found in China.

References

Moths described in 1914
Venusia (moth)